In the Mood with Tyrone Davis is a Tyrone Davis album released in 1979. This was his fourth Columbia Records release.

Singles

The album's lead single, "In the Mood", peaked at No. 6 on the Billboard Hot Soul Singles chart. The follow up, "Ain't Nothing I Can Do", reached No. 72 on the soul singles chart.

Track listing
 "In the Mood" (Darryl Ellis, Paul Richmond, Ruben Locke Jr.) – 4:12
 "You Know What to Do" (Leo Graham) – 5:51
 "I Can't Wait" (Leo Graham) – 3:55
 "Keep On Dancin'" (Leo Graham, Paul Richmond) – 3:40
 "I Don't Think You Heard Me" (Eddie Fisher, Leo Graham) – 4:02
 "Ain't Nothing I Can Do" (Leo Graham, Paul Richmond) – 4:47
 "All the Love I Need" (Leo Graham, Paul Richmond) – 3:42
 "We Were in Love Then" (Walter Hatchet) – 4:01

Bonus tracks

Personnel

 Tyrone Davis – lead vocals
 Calvin Bridges, James Mack – keyboards
 Terry Fryer – synth
 Bernard Reed, Paul Richmond, Ron Harris – bass
 Eddie Fisher, Keith Howard, Morris Jennings, Quinton Joseph, Ruben Locke Jr., Stephen Cobb – drums
 Billy Durham, Charles Colbert, Cynthia Harrell, Darryl Ellis, James Mack, Leo Graham, Mary Ann Stewart, Paul Richmond, Ruben Locke Jr., Vivian Haywood – background vocals
 Steele 'Sonny' Seals* – saxophone
 James Mack – alto flute
 John Avante, Stephen Berry – trombone
 Bobby Lewis, Charles Handy, Lionel Bordelon – trumpet

Charts

References

External links
 

1979 albums
Tyrone Davis albums
Columbia Records albums
Albums produced by Leo Graham (songwriter)